KwaZulu-Natal (also referred to as KZN and known as "the garden province") is a province of South Africa that was created in 1994 when the Zulu bantustan of KwaZulu ("Place of the Zulu" in Zulu) and Natal Province were merged. It is located in the southeast of the country, with a long shoreline on the Indian Ocean and sharing borders with three other provinces and the countries of Mozambique, Eswatini and Lesotho. Its capital is Pietermaritzburg, and its largest city is Durban. It is the second-most populous province in South Africa, with slightly fewer residents than Gauteng.

Two areas in KwaZulu-Natal have been declared UNESCO World Heritage Sites: the iSimangaliso Wetland Park and the uKhahlamba Drakensberg Park. These areas are extremely scenic as well as important to the surrounding ecosystems.

During the 1830s and early 1840s, the northern part of what is now KwaZulu-Natal was established as the Zulu Kingdom while the southern part was, briefly, the Boer Natalia Republic before becoming the British Colony of Natal in 1843. The Zulu Kingdom remained independent until 1879.

KwaZulu-Natal is the birthplace of many notable figures in South Africa's history, such as Albert Luthuli, the first non-white and the first person from outside Europe and the Americas to be awarded the Nobel Peace Prize (1960); Pixley ka Isaka Seme, the founder of the African National Congress (ANC) and South Africa's first black lawyer; John Langalibalele Dube, the ANC's founding president; Harry Gwala, ANC member and anti-apartheid activist; Mac Maharaj, grammy award winning group Ladysmith Black Mambazo, grammy award winning DJ Black Coffee, ANC member, anti-apartheid activist and Little Rivonia Trial defendant; Mangosuthu Buthelezi, the founder of the Inkatha Freedom Party (IFP); Anton Lembede, the founding president of the ANC Youth League; Jacob Zuma, the former President of South Africa; Bhambatha, a 19th-century Zulu chief who became an anti-apartheid icon; and Shaka Zulu.

Geography 

It has three different geographic areas and is the eastern most province in the country. The lowland region along the Indian Ocean coast is extremely narrow in the south, widening in the northern part of the province, while the central Natal Midlands consists of an undulating hilly plateau rising toward the west. Two mountainous areas, the western Drakensberg Mountains and northern Lebombo Mountains form, respectively, a solid basalt wall rising over  beside Lesotho border and low parallel ranges of ancient granite running southward from Eswatini. The area's largest river, the Tugela, flows west to east across the center of the province.

The coastal regions typically have subtropical thickets and deeper ravines; steep slopes host some Afromontane Forest. The midlands have moist grasslands and isolated pockets of Afromontane Forest. The north has a primarily moist savanna habitat, whilst the Drakensberg region hosts mostly alpine grassland.

The province contains rich areas of biodiversity of a range of flora and fauna. The iSimangaliso Wetland Park and the uKhahlamba Drakensberg Park have been declared UNESCO World Heritage Sites. The iSimangaliso Wetland Park, along with uKhahlamba Drakensberg Park and Ndumo, are wetlands of international importance for migratory species, and are designated as Ramsar sites. South Africa signed the 1971 Ramsar Convention to try to conserve and protect important wetlands because of their importance to habitats and numerous species.

The former Eastern Cape enclave of the town of Umzimkulu and its hinterland have been incorporated into KwaZulu-Natal following the 12th amendment of the Constitution of South Africa. The amendment also made other changes to the southern border of the province.

The northwesterly line of equal latitude and longitude traverses the province from the coast at Hibberdene to northeast Lesotho.

The province became the first to include a portion of road that is made of partial plastic, the equivalent of nearly 40,000 recycled milk cartons.

Climate

KwaZulu-Natal has a varied yet verdant climate thanks to diverse, complex topography. Generally, the coast is subtropical with inland regions becoming progressively colder. Temperature drops towards the hinterland, with Pietermaritzburg being similar in the summer, but much cooler in the winter. Ladysmith in the Tugela River Valley reaches  in the summer, but may drop below freezing point on winter evenings. The Drakensberg can experience heavy winter snow, with light snow occasionally experienced on the highest peaks in summer. The Zululand north coast has the warmest climate and highest humidity, supporting many sugar cane farms around Pongola.

Borders
KwaZulu-Natal borders the following areas of Mozambique, Eswatini and Lesotho:
Maputo Province, Mozambique        
Lubombo District, Eswatini       
Shiselweni District, Eswatini         
Mokhotlong District, Lesotho   
Thaba-Tseka District, Lesotho 
Qacha's Nek District, Lesotho 

Domestically, it borders the following provinces:
Mpumalanga   
Free State 
Eastern Cape

Administrative divisions

The KwaZulu-Natal Province is divided into one metropolitan municipality and ten district municipalities. The district municipalities are in turn divided into 44 local municipalities. The local seat of each district municipality is given in parentheses:

In 2012, the Ingonyama Trust owns 32% of the land in KwaZulu-Natal, in many municipalities. This amounts to about three million hectares, occupied by over 4 million people. The Zulu king is the chairman of the Trust.

Metropolitan municipalities

 eThekwini Metropolitan Municipality (Durban)

District municipalities

 Amajuba District (Newcastle)
 Newcastle
 Dannhauser
 eMadlangeni
 Zululand District (Ulundi)
 Ulundi
 Nongoma
 Abaqulusi
 uPhongolo
 eDumbe
 uMkhanyakude District (Mkuze)
 Jozini
 Hlabisa
 Umhlabuyalingana
 Mtubatuba
 The Big 5 False Bay
 King Cetshwayo District (Richards Bay) [formerly uThungulu]
 uMhlathuze
 Umlalazi
 Nkandla
 Mbonambi
 Ntambanana
 Mthonjaneni
 uMzinyathi District (Dundee)
 Msinga
 Nqutu
 Umvoti
 Endumeni
 Uthukela District (Ladysmith)
 Emnambithi/Ladysmith
 Indaka
 Umtshezi
 Okhahlamba
 Imbabazane
 uMgungundlovu District (Pietermaritzburg)
 Msunduzi
 uMshwathi
 uMngeni
 Richmond
 Mkhambathini
 Mpofana
 Impendle
 iLembe District (kwaDukuza)
 KwaDukuza
 Ndwedwe
 Mandeni
 Maphumulo
 Ugu District (Port Shepstone)
 Ray Nkonyeni
 uMdoni
 uMuziwabantu
 Umzumbe
 Harry Gwala District (Ixopo)
 Dr Nkosazana Dlamini-Zuma
 Ubuhlebezwe
 Greater Kokstad
 Umzimkhulu

Coastline

The coastline is dotted with small towns, many of which serve as seasonal recreational hubs. The climate of the coastal areas is humid and subtropical, comparable to southern Florida in the United States, but not quite as hot and rainy in the summer. As one moves further north up the coast towards the border of Mozambique, the climate becomes almost purely tropical. North of Durban is locally referred to as "The North Coast", while south is "The South Coast". The Kwazulu-Natal Tourist board includes towns such as Margate, Port Shepstone, Scottburgh and Port Edward in its definition of the South Coast, while Ballito, Umhlanga and Salt Rock are North Coast resort towns.

Beaches of world-class quality are to be found along virtually every part of South Africa's eastern seaboard, with some of the least-developed gems found in the far southern and far northern ends of the province. Marina Beach (and its adjoining resort San Lameer) was recognised in 2002 as a Blue Flag beach.

Some visitors come for the annual late autumn or early winter phenomenon on the KwaZulu-Natal coast of the "sardine run". Referred to as "the greatest shoal on earth", the sardine run occurs when millions of sardines migrate from their spawning grounds south of the southern tip of Africa northward along the Eastern Cape coastline toward KwaZulu-Natal. They follow a route close inshore, often resulting in many fish washing up on beaches. The huge shoal of tiny fish can stretch for many kilometres; it is preyed upon by thousands of predators, including game fish, sharks, dolphins and seabirds. Usually the shoals break up and the fish disappear into deeper water around Durban. Scientists have been unable to answer many questions surrounding this exceptional seasonal event.

Interior
The interior of the province consists largely of rolling hills from the Valley of a Thousand Hills to the Midlands. Their beauty has inspired literature. Alan Paton, in the novel Cry, the Beloved Country, wrote:

History 

On Christmas Day 1497, Portuguese explorer Vasco da Gama saw the coast of Natal and named the site after the Portuguese word for Christmas, Natal. The Nguni branch of the Bantu occupied this area from the early 1300s

The first European settlers, mostly British, established Port Natal, a trading post. They made almost no attempt to develop the interior, whose inhabitants had been decimated by the Zulu king, Shaka. The Afrikaner Voortrekkers entered the area via the Drakensberg passes in 1837. These Afrikaners defeated the Zulus at the Battle of Blood River in 1838 and thereafter established the Republic of Natal. Thus, the territory was once part of a short-lived Boer republic between 1839 and 1843 until its annexation by Britain. Many Afrikaner inhabitants left for the interior after the annexation and were replaced by immigrants, mainly from Britain.

From 1860 onwards, increasing numbers of Indians, mainly Tamils, were brought in by the British mainly to work in the sugar plantations on the coast. The colony acquired Zululand (the area north of the Tugela River) after the Zulu War of 1879. The lands north of the Buffalo River were added in 1902. Boer forces entered the area during the South African War (1899 to 1902)also known as the second Boer Warand laid siege to Ladysmith. They failed to build on their initial advantage and for three months the line between the opposing forces followed the course of the Tugela River. In 1910, the colony became a province of the Union of South Africa and in 1961 of the Republic of South Africa.

When the homeland of KwaZulu, which means "Place of the Zulu" was re-incorporated into the Natal province after the end of apartheid in 1994, the province of Natal, which had existed between 1910 and 1994, was renamed KwaZulu-Natal. The province is home to the Zulu monarchy; the majority population and language of the province is Zulu. It is the only province in South Africa that has the name of its dominant ethnic group as part of its name. As with Eastern Cape, most White South Africans in KwaZulu-Natal are of British descent and less than a quarter of whites in the province are of Boer/Afrikaner descent.

Provincial coat of arms 

The lion and wildebeest supporters are symbols of, respectively, KwaZulu and Natal, the regions joined to create KwaZulu-Natal. Besides its importance as a symbol of the Zulu monarchy, the lion is also featured in the state emblems of the India and the United Kingdom which together represent the three largest people groups in KwaZulu-Natal and also represents the unity between them. The zig-zag stripe represents the Drakensberg which is green in summer but snow capped in winter and the star represents the Star of Bethlehem, due to Vasco da Gama naming the region “Natalia” (a reference to the birth of Christ) on Christmas Day in 1497. The strelitzia flower on the shield symbolizes the province's beauty, while the assegai and knobkierrie behind the shield represent protection and peace. The base of the crown element is a type of headdress traditionally worn by Zulu elders that represents wisdom and maturity; the element itself is a Zulu-style grass hut. The motto is Masisukume Sakhe, Zulu for "Let us stand up and build".

Law and government

Provincial government
KwaZulu-Natal's provincial government sits in Pietermaritzburg. The foundation stone of the new legislative building was laid on 21 June 1887, to commemorate Queen Victoria's Golden Jubilee. The building was completed two years later. On 25 April 1889, the Governor of Natal, Sir Arthur Havelock, opened the first Legislative Council session in the new building.

This was the former site of St Mary's Church, built in the 1860s. The congregation built a new church in 1884 at the corner of Burger Street and Commercial Road. The old building was demolished in 1887 to provide space for the legislative complex.

When governance was granted to Natal in 1893, the new Legislative Assembly took over the chamber used by the Legislative Council since 1889. Further extensions to the parliamentary building were made. The building was unoccupied until 1902, when it was used without being officially opened, due to the country's being engulfed in the Anglo-Boer war. The war forced the Legislative Assembly to move the venue of its sittings, as its chamber was used as a military hospital.

The Legislative Assembly and the Legislative Council buildings have both been protected as provincial landmarks. They formed a colonial Parliament of two houses: a Council of 11 nominated members and an Assembly of 37 elected members. The Natal Parliament was disbanded in 1910 when the Union of South Africa was formed, and the Assembly became the meeting place of the Natal Provincial Council. The council was disbanded in 1986.

The Provincial Legislature consists of 80 members.

Current composition

The African National Congress (ANC) holds power in the provincial legislature, winning the province with a convincing overall majority in South Africa's 2019 elections. After the election, the Inkatha Freedom Party (IFP) regained the title of the official opposition in the province.

Zulu monarchy
KwaZulu-Natal is the home to the Zulu monarch, currently King Misuzulu Zulu kaZwelithini. Although not holding any direct political power, he holds considerable influence among the more traditionalist Zulu people in the province. , The king is provided a stipend of 54 million South African rands by the provincial government. He is also the chairman of the Ingonyama Trust, which controls 32% of the area of the province.

Economy 

KwaZulu-Natal has the second largest regional economy in the country after Gauteng. Durban is a rapidly growing urban area and is by most measures the busiest port in Africa. A good railway network links the city to other areas of Southern Africa. Sugar refining is Durban's main industry. Sheep, cattle, dairy, citrus fruits, corn, sorghum, cotton, bananas, and pineapples are also raised. There is an embryonic KwaZulu-Natal wine industry. Other industries (located mainly in and around Durban) include textile, clothing, chemicals, rubber, fertiliser, paper, vehicle assembly and food-processing plants, tanneries, and oil refineries. There are large aluminium-smelting plants at Richards Bay, on the north coast.

To the north, Newcastle is the province's industrial powerhouse, with Mittal Steel South Africa (previously ISPAT/ISCOR) and the Karbochem synthetic rubber plant dominating the economy. In 2002, Newcastle became the largest producer of chrome chemicals in Africa with the completion of a chrome-chemical plant, a joint-venture project between Karbochem and German manufacturing giant Bayer. Other large operations include a diamond-cutting works, various heavy engineering concerns, the Natal Portland Cement (NPC) slagment cement factory, and the Newcastle Cogeneration Plant (old Ingagane Power Station). This was recommissioned as Africa's first gas-fired power station by Independent Power Southern Africa (IPSA), and it supplies the Karbochem Plant with electricity. The textile industry is a major employer in the Newcastle area, with over 100 factories belonging to ethnic Taiwanese and Chinese industrialists. Maize, livestock and dairy farmers operate on the outskirts of the city. Coal is also mined in the Newcastle area. The province as a whole produces considerable amounts of coal (especially coke) and timber. 

Offshore mining of heavy mineral sands including minerals with a concentration of significant economic importance at several locations, such as rutile, ilmenite and zircon are threatening the marine ecology of KwaZulu-Natal's coast, including the Tugela Banks; the fishing economy of the prawn and nurse fisheries are also threatened.

About 86% of the population is Black African. During apartheid, a large percentage of native blacks was forced to live in Bantu homelands (Bantustans), which had a subsistence economy based on cattle raising and corn growing.

Ecology tourism is increasingly important to the economy of KwaZulu-Natal. The area's rich biodiversity and efforts at conservation have been recognised. Tourists have come to see the iSimangaliso Wetland Park and the uKhahlamba Drakensberg Park, declared UNESCO World Heritage Sites. These two major parks and that of Ndumo have wetlands of international importance listed as Ramsar sites for conservation. Tourists pay up to $10,000 for safaris on which they might see lions, elephants and giraffes. Others come to hike in the mountains or explore the wetlands with guides.

Civil society and politics 

Prominent civil society organisations based in the province of KwaZulu-Natal include: Abahlali baseMjondolo (shackdwellers') movement, the Diakonia Council of Churches, the Right2Know campaign, and the Unemployed People's Movement.

Evictions and political controversy
The government in KwaZulu Natal has been under sustained controversy for their eviction of shackdwellers and mistreatment by provincial police structures that has resulted in more than 200 arrests of Abahlali members in the first last three years of its existence and repeated police brutality in people's homes, in the streets and in detention.

The attack on Kennedy Road informal settlement by an armed mob in 2009 in [Durban] put local and provincial government under sustained scrutiny. It was reported by members of the Abahlali baseMjondolo movement that the attackers were affiliated with the local branch of the African National Congress and it was claimed that the attack was carefully planned and sanctioned by the provincial police department. Academic research seems to confirm that the attackers self-identified as ANC members and that ANC leaders at Municipal and Provincial level later provided public sanction for the attack.

Despite a court interdict, the eThekwini municipality, with the support of the provincial SAPS, repeatedly evicted shackdwellers in Durban's Cato Crest. The General Council of the Bar has also expressed concern over the evictions.

Ecology 

There are various game reserves found in the province; one notable example is Hluhluwe–Imfolozi Park, where the southern white rhinoceros was saved from extinction.

In many of these larger reserves, large animals ranging from several antelope species to elephant, Cape buffalo and hippopotamus can be found. Predators include lions, leopards, and Cape wild dogs.

The scaly yellowfish (Labeobarbus natalensis) is a fish found in the Tugela River system as well as in the Umzimkulu, Umfolozi and the Mgeni. It is a common endemic species in KwaZulu-Natal Province and it lives in different habitats between the Drakensberg foothills and the coastal lowlands.

Carissa macrocarpa (Natal plum) is a shrub native to South Africa, where it is commonly called the "large num-num". In the Zulu language or isiZulu, as well as in the Bantu tribes of Uganda, it is known as the Amathungulu or umThungulu oBomvu. In Afrikaans, the fruit is called noem-noem.

Education

Universities
The University of KwaZulu-Natal (UKZN) has five campuses in the province. It was formed on 1 January 2004 after the merger between the University of Natal and the University of Durban-Westville. Other universities are : 
University of Zululand
Durban University of Technology 
Mangosuthu University of Technology
 University of South Africa

Colleges

 AAA School of Advertising
 Berea College of Technology
 Berea Technical College
 CTU Training Solutions
 Central Technical College
 Damelin College
 Eduvos
 Ethekwini college
 ICESA Education
 iStudent
 MANCOSA
 Management and Leadership Academy
 Pax college
 Regent Business School
 Richfield Graduate institute of Technology
 Stadio institute of Higher Education (Embury institute for higher education)
 The Business School at Varsity College
 Oval International Education

Sport

Major sports events
 Comrades Marathon, an annual marathon run between Pietermaritzburg and Durban.
 Midmar Mile, a mile-long swimming race held annually at Midmar Dam.
 Dusi Canoe Marathon, an annual canoe marathon starting in Pietermaritzburg and ending in Durban.
 Durban July, South Africa's premier annual horse racing event at Greyville Racecourse, Durban.
 Mr Price Pro, a premier international surfing event at Durban during winter (previously known as the "Gunston 500").

Provincial sports teams
 Football (soccer)
 The South African Premier Soccer League (PSL) currently features the following teams from the province:
 AmaZulu, Golden Arrows and Royal AM 
 Thanda Royal Zulu 
 Maritzburg United 

 Rugby union
 United Rugby Championship
 The Sharks
 Currie Cup
 

 Cricket
 SuperSport Series
 Dolphins 

 Basketball
 Kwazulu Marlins

 Netball
 Kingdom Stars
 Kingdom Queens

References

External links 

 
 Kwazulu-Natal Tourism Authority

 
1856 in South Africa
Provinces of South Africa
States and territories established in 1994
1994 establishments in South Africa